Corey Jenkins (born August 25, 1976) is a former American football player. He played quarterback at the University of South Carolina and was drafted by the Miami Dolphins. He saw limited playing time in the National Football League and Canadian Football League.

Career
Jenkins was a standout athlete at Columbia, South Carolina's Dreher High School, where he was a three sport star.

Baseball
Jenkins was drafted in the first round (24th overall selection) of the 1995 MLB draft by the Boston Red Sox. He played four seasons in Boston's minor league system before he was traded to the Chicago White Sox. He made it to the Double-A level before getting released in 1999.

Football
Jenkins next played football at Garden City Community College where he was a two-time All-American. He was then recruited to play football under Lou Holtz at the University of South Carolina.  After two seasons with the Gamecocks, Jenkins was drafted by the Miami Dolphins in the sixth round of the 2003 NFL Draft. He played two seasons with Miami and one with the Chicago Bears.

Coaching career
Jenkins is currently the head coach of the Dreher High School (Columbia, South Carolina)|] football team in Columbia, South Carolina.

Personal life
Jenkins had an article written about him in the May 2011 issue of ESPN The Magazine about a Ponzi Scheme that he was a victim of back in the 1990s at the start of his baseball career.

References

External links
Pro Football Reference stats
ESPN Sports bio
Gamecocks football report

1976 births
Living people
Players of Canadian football from Columbia, South Carolina
American football linebackers
South Carolina Gamecocks football players
Miami Dolphins players
Chicago Bears players
American players of Canadian football
Canadian football linebackers
Winnipeg Blue Bombers players
American football quarterbacks
Players of American football from Columbia, South Carolina
Birmingham Barons players
Burlington Bees players
Gulf Coast Red Sox players
Lowell Spinners players
Michigan Battle Cats players
Sarasota Red Sox players